Kill or Be Killed (also known as Ringo Against Johnny Colt and Kill or Die) is a 1966 Italian Spaghetti Western film directed by Tanio Boccia.

Cast 

 Rod Dana: Johnny Ringo (credited as Robert Mark)
 Elina DeWitt: Lisa Drumont
 Gordon Mitchell: Baltimore Joe
 Andrea Bosic: Sheriff
 Fabrizio Moroni: Spott Griffith 
 Alberto Farnese: Chester Griffith 
 Beniamino Maggio: Petrack 
 Furio Meniconi: Jonathan Griffith 
 Remo Capitani
 Renato Terra

References

External links

1966 films
Spaghetti Western films
1966 Western (genre) films
Films directed by Tanio Boccia
Films scored by Carlo Rustichelli
1960s Italian-language films
1960s Italian films